Earl "Lucky" Teter (9 October 1901 – 5 July 1942) was an American stunt driver, showman and entrepreneur. He pioneered and popularized the touring stunt driving show, performing across the country until his death in a car jumping stunt.

Born in Noblesville, Indiana, Teter was a gas station attendant who, by 1932, was performing automobile and motorcycle stunts. "Lucky Teter and His Hell Drivers" performed across the United States and Canada beginning in 1936, and had great success for six years.  His show was so popular that, in some years, he performed at the Canadian National Exhibition in Toronto in the afternoons, then flew to Syracuse, New York, to appear in the New York State Fair at night, which required two sets of equipment. He is credited with creating such now-staple stunts as jumping a car from ramp to ramp and rolling a car. He was also the first to team up with an automobile company, in his case Plymouth, promoting its products in exchange for backing.

He entered the 1936 Indianapolis 500, but did not race. He also appeared in some documentary shorts and did some (uncredited) stunt driving for the 1936 film Speed, which featured James Stewart in his first starring role.

On 5 July 1942, he was the last performer at an Army Relief benefit at the Indiana State Fair Grounds. He planned to break his own world distance record by jumping  over a transport truck. He died in the ambulance taking him to the hospital.

His widow sold the show to Joie Chitwood.

He was the subject of a 2011 documentary, Lucky Teter and His Hell Drivers, which has been released on DVD and can also be rented online.

References

External links
 
 A short clip of Teter jumping over a bus, courtesy of Getty Images

1901 births
1942 deaths
American stunt performers
Stunt drivers
People from Noblesville, Indiana